Yuxarı Cülyan (also, Dzhyul’yan and Dzhul’yan) is a village and municipality in the Ismailli Rayon of Azerbaijan. It has a population of 187. The municipality consists of the villages of Cülyan, Daxar, and Mulux.

References 

Populated places in Ismayilli District